William James Rudd (29 June 1880 – 27 March 1971) was an English first-class cricketer active 1901–04 who played for Surrey. He was born in Little Amwell; died in Ipswich.

References

1880 births
1971 deaths
English cricketers
Surrey cricketers
Hertfordshire cricketers